Conner Blöte (born 17 January 1998) is a Dutch footballer who plays as a defender for SO Soest in the Tweede Klasse. He is a former Netherlands youth international.

Club career
He made his Eerste Divisie debut for Jong FC Utrecht on 25 August 2017 in a game against FC Dordrecht, coming on as a substitute in the 80th minute for Tim Brinkman. In May 2018, Blöte signed a contract with Utrecht-based club USV Hercules. In 2019, he completed a trial at Finnish club SJK, but decided to stay in the Netherlands. In 2020, he moved to amateur club SO Soest competing in the seventh tier of Dutch football league system.

References

External links
 

1998 births
People from Nieuwegein
Living people
Dutch footballers
Netherlands youth international footballers
Jong FC Utrecht players
Eerste Divisie players
Association football defenders
Derde Divisie players
USV Hercules players
Footballers from Utrecht (province)